Jack Pinoteau (20 September 1923 – 6 April 2017) or Jacques Pinoteau was a French film director born at Clairefontaine-en-Yvelines. A brother of Claude Pinoteau and Arlette Merry, he is mostly known for his direction of the film , after a novel by René Fallet which made Darry Cowl famous.

Pinoteau died on 6 April 2017, aged 93.

Filmography

Cinema

Film director 
 1952 : They Were Five with Jean Carmet, Jean Gaven
 1954 : The Big Flag with Jean Chevrier, Nicole Courcel
 1956 : L'Ami de la famille with Darry Cowl
 1957 : Le Triporteur with Darry Cowl
 1958 : Chéri, fais-moi peur with Darry Cowl
 1960 : Robinson et le triporteur with Darry Cowl
 1963 : People in Luck
 1964 : Les Durs à cuire with Jean Poiret, Michel Serrault and Roger Pierre
 1965 : Me and the Forty Year Old Man with Dany Saval, Paul Meurisse and Michel Serrault

Assistant director 
 1948 : Rapide de nuit by Marcel Blistène
 1949 : Five Red Tulips by Jean Stelli
 1949 : On n'aime qu'une fois by Jean Stelli
 1949 : Dernier Amour by Jean Stelli
 1950 :  by Jacqueline Audry
 1950 : Les Maîtres nageurs by Henri Lepage
 1950 : Quai de Grenelle by Emil-Edwin Reinert
 1951 : The Red Needle by Emil-Edwin Reinert
 1952 : Plume au vent by Louis Cuny

Actor 
 1943 : Le Carrefour des enfants perdus by Léo Joannon

Television 
 1966 : , TV serial with Yves Rénier
 1967 : S.O.S. Fernand, with Fernandel

References

External links 
 
 Filme von Jack Pinoteau mit deutschen Verleihtiteln

French film directors
1923 births
Chevaliers of the Légion d'honneur
People from Yvelines
2017 deaths